Abramakabra was a West German comedy television series broadcast between 1972 and 1976. Many of the sketches were examples of black comedy.

See also
List of German television series

External links
 

German comedy television series
1972 German television series debuts
1976 German television series endings
Black comedy television shows
German-language television shows
Das Erste original programming